KGS can refer to:
KGS (electronic toll collection), Turkey
Kos Island International Airport, IATA airport code
 The Kansas Geological Survey
 The KGS Go Server
 Kingston Grammar School, London, UK
 King George School (Calgary, Alberta), Canada
 Kings Sutton railway station, England; National Rail station code
 Karachi Grammar School, Pakistan
 Kyrgyzstani som currency, ISO 4217 code
 Knots ground speed, in aviation